Týn nad Vltavou is a town in České Budějovice District in the South Bohemian Region of the Czech Republic. It has about 7,800 inhabitants. It lies on the Vltava river. The historic town centre is well preserved and is protected by law as an urban monument zone.

Administrative parts
Villages of Hněvkovice na levém břehu Vltavy, Koloděje nad Lužnicí, Netěchovice, Nuzice, Předčice and Vesce are administrative parts of Týn nad Vltavou.

Etymology
The Old Czech word týn is related to English "town". It was a term for a fortified settlement.

Geography
The town lies on the Vltava river, at its confluence with the Lužnice.

History

A settlement in the area was probably founded in the 11th century. The first written mention of Týn nad Vltavou is from 1229, when it was a part of bishop's dominion. After 1251, a new centre of the settlement was established and built around the Church of Saint Christoforos, near a road connecting two local fords. The fords were replaced by a wooden bridge.

In the late 13th century, a development occurred, and a stone castle for protection of the trade route from Nuremberg to Vienna was built. In 1327, Týn nad Vltavou was first referred to as a town. The town acquired a customs office authorizing the collection of tolls, the connection with Prague was ensured by rafting and boating on the Vltava, and Týn became rich and prospering.

During the Hussite Wars, the church was burned down, otherwise the town was not affected by the war. However, the town was affected by later religious disputes and wars and was burned down in 1468. After 1543 during the rule of Jan III Čabelický, the desolated castle was repaired. In 1564, a large fire destroyed most of the houses on the square and the church. In 1569, the church was rebuilt, extended and consecrated to James the Great.

In 1601, Týn was confiscated by the royal chamber. In 1608, it was promoted to a royal town by Rudolf II, but in 1621 after the Battle of White Mountain, it was returned to Prague Archbishopric and became again a serfdom town. During the Thirty Years' War, the town was repeatedly burned and devastated. The town lost two thirds of the houses and the castle. The decline continued after the war, and in 1680 the town was hit by a plague epidemic.

Until 1918, Moldauthein – Tyn nad Vltavou was part of the Austrian monarchy (Austria side after the compromise of 1867), in the district with the same name, one of the 94 Bezirkshauptmannschaften in Bohemia.

Demographics

Sights

The historic centre is formed by Míru Square with many preserved Renaissance and Gothic-Renaissance houses, and adjacent streets. The main landmarks of the square are the town hall, the church, and the castle. The Renaissance town hall was built in the 17th century and rebuilt after a fire in 1796. The facade of the building in the late Baroque style was lightened by arcades.

The Church of Saint James the Great comes from 1569 was Baroquely reconstructed in 1753–1763.

Týn nad Vltavou Castle is the largest building in the town centre. It was built in 1699 as seat of the archbishop's administration. The building has an early Baroque facade with Classicist adjustments. The castle also includes underground spaces open to the public. Today the castle serves as a library and as Town Museum Týn nad Vltavou. The museum was founded in 1932 and consists of expositions of local history, historical puppets, moldavites, and life and work of Alfréd Radok.

The remains of the original Gothic castle are accessible. Only a stone bridge and few ramparts are preserved. On the site of a former castle, a revolving auditorium was built in 1983. It is the only amateur scene of its kind in the world.

Smaller castles Hněvkovice and Koloděje nad Lužnicí are located in eponymous villages.

In popular culture
Films Kameňák, Kameňák 2 and Kameňák 3 were filmed here.

Notable people
Matěj Kopecký (1775–1847), puppeteer; lived and died here
Alfréd Radok (1914–1976), stage director and film director

Gallery

References

External links

Cities and towns in the Czech Republic
Populated places in České Budějovice District